Grimley Glacier is a tributary glacier,  long and  wide, lying 3 nautical miles north of Sunfix Glacier and flowing east-northeast into Casey Glacier in northern Palmer Land, Antarctica. The glacier was photographed from the air by the United States Antarctic Service on September 28, 1940, and by the Ronne Antarctic Research Expedition on December 22, 1947. It was surveyed by the Falkland Islands Dependencies Survey (FIDS) in December 1960 and was named by the UK Antarctic Place-Names Committee for Peter H. Grimley of FIDS, a geologist at Horseshoe Island and Stonington Island in 1960.

References

Glaciers of Fallières Coast